VNJ may refer to
 Vestbanen (company), also known as Varde-Nørre Nebel Jernbane
 Vlaams Nationaal Jeugdverbond, Flemish National Youth Union, a Flemish youth movement